Heinz Halm (born 21 February 1942 in Andernach, Rhine Province) is a German scholar of Islamic Studies, with a particular expertise on early Shia history, the Ismailites and other Shia sects.

Life
Born and raised in Andernach, Halm studied Islamic and Semitic studies, and medieval and modern history at the University of Bonn, where he was a scholar of Annemarie Schimmel. In 1980, he was appointed Professor for Islamic Studies at the University of Tübingen.

Work
Halm's book The Shiites was reviewed in the International Journal of Middle East Studies by Said Amir Arjomand who remarked that "Halm’s historical perspective is a welcome corrective to the ahistorical shallowness of the vast majority of the accounts of the Islamic Revolution." Arjomand recommends the book as "a short historical introduction to Shi`ism, it is serviceable to the general public and has no rival or substitute.”

Further reading

References

External links
  

1942 births
Living people
People from Andernach
People from the Rhine Province
German Islamic studies scholars
Scholars of Shia Islam
University of Bonn alumni
Academic staff of the University of Tübingen